

Dean Martin Sings Songs from "The Silencers" is a 1966 studio album by Dean Martin of songs that featured in his film The Silencers, the first of the four films featuring the Matt Helm character that Martin would appear in. A separate soundtrack of instrumental music from the film by Elmer Bernstein was also released. The album was arranged by Ernie Freeman and Gene Page.

Many of the Tin Pan Alley songs featured on this album appeared in the film, as songs imagined by Martin's character. The album also features four recordings of incidental music from the film.

This was the second of five albums that Martin released in 1966.  As well as starring in The Silencers that year he also starred in two other films; another Matt Helm film, Murderer's Row, and Texas Across the River, and appeared in his own television show. Dean Martin Sings Songs from "The Silencers" peaked at 108 on the Billboard 200. Dean Martin Sings Songs from "The Silencers" was the last soundtrack album that Martin recorded. The 1960s had also seen Martin appear on the soundtrack to Robin and the 7 Hoods, a 1964 film fellow Rat Pack members Frank Sinatra and Sammy Davis, Jr., with Bing Crosby.

Reception

William Ruhlmann on Allmusic.com gave the album two and a half stars out of five. Ruhlmann commented on the "bravura treatment" given to the songs by Ernie Freeman and Gene Page's arrangements, but added that as a film tie-in, the album "deservedly didn't attract much attention, although Martin's popularity assured it would spend several weeks in the charts."

Track listing 
 "The Glory of Love" (Billy Hill) - 2:20
 "Empty Saddles (in the Old Corral)" (Hill) - 2:22
 "Lovey Kravezit" - 2:28
 "The Last Round-Up" (Hill) - 3:14
 "Anniversary Song" (Saul Chaplin, Al Jolson) - 2:33
 "Side by Side" (Harry M. Woods) - 2:15
 "South of the Border" (Michael Carr, Jimmy Kennedy) - 2:41
 "Red Sails in the Sunset" (Kennedy, Hugh Williams) - 2:38
 "Lord, You Made the Night Too Long" (Michelle Lewis) - 2:34
 "If You Knew Susie (Like I Know Susie)" (Joseph Meyer) - 2:14
 "On the Sunny Side of the Street" (Dorothy Fields, Jimmy McHugh) - 2:34
 "The Silencers" (Elmer Bernstein, Hal David) - 2:13

Personnel 
 Dean Martin – vocals
 Ernie Freeman - arranger
 Gene Page
 Ed Thrasher - art direction
 Eddie Brackett - engineer
 Jimmy Bowen - producer

References 

1966 albums
1966 soundtrack albums
Dean Martin albums
Albums arranged by Ernie Freeman
Albums arranged by Gene Page
Albums produced by Jimmy Bowen
Reprise Records albums